Nathan Stanley (born August 26, 1997) is an American football quarterback who is a free agent. He played college football at Iowa and was drafted by the Vikings in the seventh round of the 2020 NFL Draft.

Early years
Stanley attended Menomonie High School in Menomonie, Wisconsin. During his career, he had 3,674 yards and 36 touchdowns. He committed to the University of Iowa to play college football. Stanley also played baseball and basketball in high school.

College career
Stanley spent his freshman season at Iowa as a backup to C. J. Beathard. He appeared in five games, completing five of nine passes for 62 yards. With Beathard graduating, Stanley was named Iowa's starting quarterback in 2017. In his first career start, he passed for 125 yards and three touchdowns. Stanley started 39 consecutive games compiling a 27–12 record, including a 3–0 record in bowl games. He finished his career second all-time in passing yards and touchdowns in Iowa football history.

Statistics

Professional career

Minnesota Vikings
Stanley was drafted by the Minnesota Vikings in the seventh round with the 244th overall pick of the 2020 NFL Draft. He was waived by the Vikings during final roster cuts on September 5, 2020, and was signed to the practice squad the next day. He signed a reserve/future contract with the Vikings on January 4, 2021.

On August 31, 2021, Stanley was waived/injured by the Vikings and placed on injured reserve.

On July 19, 2022, Stanley was cut by the Vikings.

Personal life
Stanley is a Christian. Stanley also enjoys hunting, fishing, and woodworking.

References

External links
Minnesota Vikings bio
Iowa Hawkeyes bio

1997 births
Living people
Players of American football from Wisconsin
American football quarterbacks
Iowa Hawkeyes football players
Minnesota Vikings players
People from Menomonie, Wisconsin